David Schweickart (born 1942) is an American mathematician and philosopher. He holds a BS in Mathematics from University of Dayton, a PhD in Mathematics from University of Virginia, and a PhD in Philosophy from Ohio State University. He currently is Professor of Philosophy at Loyola University Chicago.

He has taught at Loyola since 1975. He was a visiting professor of mathematics at the University of Kentucky from 1969 to 1970, and a visiting professor of philosophy at the University of New Hampshire from 1986 to 1987. He has also lectured in Spain, Cuba, El Salvador, Italy, and the Czech Republic, as well as throughout the United States. In 1999, Schweickart was named Faculty Member of the Year at Loyola University Chicago.

He is an editor and contributing writer to SolidarityEconomy.net, an online journal dedicated to economic democracy.

Economic democracy 
In After Capitalism and other works, Schweickart has developed the model of market socialism he refers to as "economic democracy". In his own words, "Economic Democracy is a market economy." It embodies several key ideas:
 Workplace self-management, including election of supervisors
 Management of capital investment by a form of public banking
 A market for goods, raw materials, instruments of production, etc.
 Protectionism to enforce trade equality between nations

The firms and factories are owned by society and managed by the workers. These enterprises, so managed, compete in markets to sell their goods. Profit is shared by the workers. Each enterprise is taxed for the capital they employ, and that tax is distributed to public banks, who fund expansion of existing and new industry.

Critiques 
In 2006, Schweickart wrote a detailed critique of participatory economics, called Nonsense on Stilts: Michael Albert's Parecon. He claimed three fundamental features of the economic system are flawed.

Published works 
 After Capitalism (Rowman and Littlefield, 2002) - 
 Market Socialism: The Debate Among Socialists, with Bertell Ollman, Hillel Ticktin and James Lawler (Routledge, 1998)
 Against Capitalism (Cambridge University Press, 1993; Spanish translation, 1997; Chinese translation, 2003)
 Capitalism or Worker Control? An Ethical and Economic Appraisal (Praeger, 1980)

See also 
 American philosophy
 List of American philosophers

References

External links 
 Schweickart's faculty homepage at Loyola University Chicago
 The National Cooperative Grocers Association—An organization of cooperatively owned food stores. Cooperators hold economic democracy to be a key element of their movement.
 SolidarityEconomy.net—An online journal of radical social change that features David Schweickart's works and other writings on economic democracy and leftist politics.
 "After Capitalism" in Facebook

American economics writers
American male non-fiction writers
20th-century American mathematicians
21st-century American mathematicians
American philosophers
American socialists
American cooperative organizers
Loyola University Chicago faculty
Mondragon Corporation
Ohio State University Graduate School alumni
People from Dayton, Ohio
University of Dayton alumni
University of Kentucky alumni
University of Virginia alumni
1942 births
Living people
Socialist economists